Highland Lakes State Park is a  undeveloped state park in the towns of Wallkill and Crawford in Orange County, New York, United States. The park is located northeast of the city of Middletown, west of Route 211. It is the largest undeveloped park managed by the Palisades Interstate Park Commission.

Park description
Highland Lakes State Park is a largely undeveloped park, and primarily offers opportunities for passive recreation including hiking, fishing, horseback riding and model airplane flying. Although a series of informal trails and woodland roads exist within the park, no trails are officially maintained.

See also 
List of New York state parks

References

External links 
 New York State Parks: Highland Lakes State Park
 Palisades Parks Conservancy: Highland Lakes State Park

Palisades Interstate Park system
Parks in Orange County, New York
State parks of New York (state)
1964 establishments in New York (state)
Protected areas established in 1964